Fortuin is a Dutch and Afrikaans surname. Though meaning "fortune" in Dutch, the name usually appears derived from the French surname Fortin ("small fort"). Variant spellings are Fortuijn and Fortuyn, each pronounced  in Dutch. People with this surname include:

Aston Fortuin (born 1996), South African rugby player
Bevin Fortuin (born 1979), South African rugby player
Bjorn Fortuin (born 1994), South African cricketer
  (born 1940 ), Dutch mathematician; the "F" in the FKG inequality and the FK cluster model
Clyde Fortuin (born 1995), South African cricketer
Gregory Fortuin, South African businessman in Australia and New Zealand
Harold Fortuin (born 1964), American composer and pianist
 (born 1959), Dutch sculptor and installation artist
 Nicole Fortuin (born 1992, South African actress
Pim Fortuijn, later Pim Fortuyn (1948–2002), Dutch social scientist and politician

See also
 Fortuyn (disambiguation)

References

Dutch-language surnames